Babilônia may refer to:

 Babilônia (album), an album by Rita Lee & Tutti Frutti
 Babilônia (telenovela), a 2015 Brazilian telenovela
 Morro da Babilônia, a favela in the Leme neighbourhood of Rio de Janeiro

See also
 Babilonia (disambiguation)